The 2015 6 Hours of Circuit of the Americas was an endurance sports car racing event held at the Circuit of the Americas, Austin, US, on 17–19 September 2015, and served as the fifth round of the 2015 FIA World Endurance Championship season. Porsche's Timo Bernhard, Brendon Hartley and Mark Webber won the race driving the No. 17 Porsche 919 Hybrid car.

Qualifying

Qualifying result
Pole position winners in each class are marked in bold.

 – Only one driver of the No. 36 Signatech Alpine set a lap time.

 – The No. 47 KCMG had its qualifying lap time deleted due to driving the car in the opposite direction of the track, but was allowed to start from the rear of the LMP grid.

Race

Race result
Class winners in bold.

References

Circuit of the Americas
Circuit of the Americas
Lone Star Le Mans
Sports in Austin, Texas
Motorsport competitions in Texas